The Cottage Bakery is a historic building on Central Avenue (former U.S. Route 66) in Albuquerque, New Mexico. It was built in 1937 by a local bakery, the Cottage Pure Food Shoppe, and is significant as a relatively unaltered 1930s food-vending establishment, as well as for its use of roadside novelty architecture to attract customers. The front of the building was constructed in the form of a thatched cottage, which was intended to evoke "a bucolic purity that clients would associate with dairy and bakery products". It was listed on the New Mexico State Register of Cultural Properties and the National Register of Historic Places in 1993.

The front section of the building is a one-story, side-gabled brick building with two eyebrow arches that give it the appearance of a thatched roof. It has two separate storefronts, each with multi-light corner windows and an arched doorway with brick trim. The eastern section of the building (2004 Central) originally housed the retail outlet of the Cottage bakery, while the Spot Ice Cream Company was located next door at 2000 Central. Behind the cottage is a larger, more utilitarian one-story cinder block section which housed the commercial baking plant.

References

Commercial buildings on the National Register of Historic Places in New Mexico
National Register of Historic Places in Albuquerque, New Mexico
Commercial buildings in Albuquerque, New Mexico
New Mexico State Register of Cultural Properties
Commercial buildings completed in 1937
Buildings and structures on U.S. Route 66
Retail buildings in New Mexico
Bakeries of the United States